The Journal of the American Statistical Association (JASA) is the primary journal published by the American Statistical Association, the main professional body for statisticians in the United States. It is published four times a year in March, June, September and December by Taylor & Francis, Ltd on behalf of the American Statistical Association.

As a statistics journal it publishes articles primarily focused on the application of statistics, statistical theory and methods in economic, social, physical, engineering, and health sciences. The journal also includes reviews of academic books which are important to the advancement of the field.

It had an impact factor of 2.063 in 2010, tenth highest in the "Statistics and Probability" category of Journal Citation Reports.

In a 2003 survey of statisticians, the Journal of the American Statistical Association was ranked first, among all journals, for "Applications of Statistics" and second (after Annals of Statistics) for "Mathematical Statistics".

The predecessor of this journal started in 1888 with the name Publications of the American Statistical Association.  It became Quarterly Publications of the American Statistical Association in 1912, and JASA in 1922.

References

External links
 Journal of the American Statistical Association

American Statistical Association academic journals
American Statistical Association
Academic journals published by learned and professional societies of the United States